Marcela Mišúnová (born 1972) is a Czech and Slovak Paralympic alpine skier. She represented Czechoslovakia at the 1992 Paralympic Winter Games in Albertville, and Slovakia at the 1994 Paralympic Winter Games in Lillehammer. She won three medals, one silver and two bronze medals .

Career 
At the 1992 Winter Paralympics, she won a silver medal in Super-G LW5/7,6/8, and bronze medal in the Women's Slalom LW5/7,6/8. She competed in Women's Giant Slalom LW5/7,6/8 finishing fifth, and Women's Downhill LW5/7,6/8 finishing seventh.

At the 1994 Winter Paralympics, she won a bronze medal in Women's Slalom LW6/8. She competed in Women's Giant Slalom LW6/8 finishing fourth, Women's Super-G LW6/8 finishing fifth, and Women's Downhill LW6/8 finishing sixth.

At the 1996 Summer Paralympics, she competed in Women's Javelin F42-44/46 finishing fourth, and Women's Shot Put F42-44/46 finishing ninth.

At the 1998 Winter Paralympics in Nagano, she competed in Women's Super-G LW3,4,5/7,6/8 finishing ninth, Women's Slalom LW3,4,5/7,6/8, and Women's Giant Slalom LW3,4,5/7,6/8.

At the 2000 Summer Paralympics, she competed in Women's Javelin F46, finishing sixth.

She competed at the 1998 IPC Athletics World Championships, in Birmingham, winning a bronze medal in Women's Javelin F46, and in Women's Shot Put F46.

References 

Living people
1972 births
Paralympic alpine skiers of Czechoslovakia
Paralympic athletes of Slovakia
Slovak javelin throwers
Slovak shot putters
Alpine skiers at the 1992 Winter Paralympics
Alpine skiers at the 1994 Winter Paralympics
Alpine skiers at the 1998 Winter Paralympics
Athletes (track and field) at the 1996 Summer Paralympics
Athletes (track and field) at the 2000 Summer Paralympics
Medalists at the 1992 Winter Paralympics
Medalists at the 1994 Winter Paralympics
Paralympic silver medalists for Czechoslovakia
Paralympic bronze medalists for Slovakia